, provisional designation , is a stony, sub-kilometer sized asteroid and fast rotator, classified as a near-Earth object and potentially hazardous asteroid of the Apollo group. It had been one of the objects with the highest impact threat on the Palermo Technical Impact Hazard Scale.

Discovery 

It was discovered on 24 January 2011, by a team of astronomers at Pan-STARRS, the Panoramic Survey Telescope and Rapid Response System at Haleakala Observatory on Hawaii, United States. The discovery was made using a 1.8-meter Ritchey–Chrétien telescope. At the time of discovery, the object had an apparent magnitude of 22.

Orbit 

Before the 2013 recovery it had an observation arc of 41 days with an uncertainty parameter of 7. Due to precovery images from 2007 it now has an observation arc of more than 5 years. It makes close approaches to Earth and Mars.

On 28 December 2013, it passed  from Earth. The December 2013 passage was studied by the Goldstone Deep Space Network and further refined the orbit.

Impact risk 

While listed on the Sentry Risk Table, virtual clones of the asteroid that fit the uncertainty region in the known trajectory showed a 1 in 71,000 chance that the asteroid could impact Earth on 5 January 2080.

In 2013 it had the 5th highest impact threat on the Palermo Technical Impact Hazard Scale. It was removed from the Sentry Risk Table on 17 June 2013.

Physical characteristics 

This near-Earth object is characterized as a common, stony S-type asteroid by the Collaborative Asteroid Lightcurve Link (CALL).

Fast rotator 

Lightcurve analysis gave a well-defined rotation period of 0.109138 hours (393 seconds) with a brightness amplitude of 0.61 magnitude.

Diameter and albedo 

According to the CALL and JPL's impact-risk table, this near-Earth object measures 136 and 150 meters, respectively. For its size estimate, CALL uses a standard for stony asteroids of 0.20 with an absolute magnitude of 21.7.

Naming 

As of 2017, this minor planet remains unnamed.

References

External links 
 Asteroid Lightcurve Database (LCDB), query form (info )
 Dictionary of Minor Planet Names, Google books
 Asteroids and comets rotation curves, CdR – Observatoire de Genève, Raoul Behrend
 
 
 

471240
471240
471240
471240
471240
471240
20110124